2010–11 Ligue Nationale de Handball Division 1 season was the 59th since its establishment. Montpellier were the defending champions, having won their title the previous season.

Team information

League table 

source:scoresway.com

References

External links
LNH site

Handball leagues in France
2010–11 domestic handball leagues